Pudełko  is a settlement in the administrative district of Gmina Turośl, within Kolno County, Podlaskie Voivodeship, in north-eastern Poland.

References

Villages in Kolno County